Ondřej Havelka and his Melody Makers or simply The Melody Makers, is a Czech retro-band, playing American "jazz standards" and Central European jazz and swing music of the 1920s and 1930s. Carefully studied renditions of the original recordings are interspersed with solos improvised in a style authentic to the period. They are one of very few European big band formations in continual existence over more than a decade, and have been a considerable presence on the swing scene of post-Communist Central Europe.

History
The Original Prague Syncopated Orchestra split in 1995, actor and singer Ondřej Havelka with his colleague Karel Majer leaving to form their own ensemble, with Havelka as artistic director and lead vocalist, and Majer initially as bandleader but leaving after a year. This group eventually adopted the name "Melody Makers".

In recent years the group has performed a number of songs best known from Ella Fitzgerald's recordings, with Gypsy singer Věra Gondolánová as guest vocalist.

Major concerts
 A Tribute to George Gershwin (1998)
 Just for this Single Day (1999)
 The Story of Jazz (2000)
 Memories of Stardust (2001)
 Blues in My Heart (2002)
 Sweet and Burning (Dedicated to Bing Crosby) (2003)
 Echoes of Overseas Songs (2004)
 Ondřej Havelka and His Melody Makers in a Programme of Songs by Jaroslav Ježek and the Voskovec and Werich Duo (2005)
 Something Old again and yet a Brand New Thing (2007)

Discography

CD
 Ondřej Havelka uvádí The Swings (1995, Monitor/EMI)
 Mě to tady nebaví (1998, Monitor/EMI)
 Jen pro ten dnešní den (1999, Monitor/EMI)
 Rhapsody In Blue: Pocta George Gershwinovi (1999, Monitor/EMI)
 Swing It (2000, V.O.X. Music GmbH)
 Vzpomínky na hvězdný prach (2002, Hot Jazz)
 Nejlepší kusy z repertoiru Ondřeje Havelky a jeho Melody Makers (2003, Monitor/EMI)
 Tentokrát zcela Rozvrkočení / This Time Completely off their Noodles (2005, Hot Jazz)
 Ondřej Havelka a jeho Melody Makers vám přejí veselé vánoce. Bílé a oranžové (2005)
 Rhapsody In Blue Room (2007)

DVD
 Ondřej Havelka uvádí Téměř kompletní almanach filmových písní (2007, EMI).

References
 Interview for Radio Prague
 Profile of Havelka at the Prague State Opera
 Profile of Havelka at the National Theatre (Prague)

External links
 Official website

Czech jazz ensembles
Swing revival ensembles